Clohesy is a surname. Notable people with the surname include:

Alanna Clohesy (born 1962), Australian politician
Bill Clohesy (1894–1945), Australian rules football player

See also
Clohessy